Pennsylvania State Senate District 44 includes parts of Berks County, Chester County, and Montgomery County. It is currently represented by Democrat Katie Muth.

District profile
The district includes the following areas:

Berks County:

Chester County:

Montgomery County:

Senators since 1939

Recent election results

References

Pennsylvania Senate districts
Government of Berks County, Pennsylvania
Government of Chester County, Pennsylvania
Government of Montgomery County, Pennsylvania